Donovan Scott (born September 29, 1947) is an American character actor best known for his role as cadet Leslie Barbara in the 1984 film Police Academy, in which he was part of an ensemble cast.

Biography 
Scott studied for two and a half years at the prestigious American Conservatory Theater in San Francisco.

He toured as both an actor and artistic director of a theatrical troupe.

In 1977, Scott settled in Los Angeles and worked extensively in both film and television.

In 1979, he made his film debut in Steven Spielberg's 1941.

Scott also appeared in the music video for Olivia Newton-John's 1981 hit "Physical", and co-starred in Lucille Ball's 1986 ABC-TV series Life with Lucy.

From 1993 to 1994 Scott stayed in Russia and Ukraine (the Crimea) where he made 'The Children of Captain Grant' as film director, screenplay and actor.

In 2016, Scott told San Diego Gay and Lesbian News he was working with his improv group at the ACME Comedy Theatre in Los Angeles, as well as working on a 'Santa script' for television.

Filmography

References

External links

1947 births
Living people
20th-century American male actors
21st-century American male actors
American male film actors
American male television actors
American gay actors
Male actors from California
People from Chico, California
21st-century LGBT people